Charles Goodyear (1800–1860) was an American self-taught chemist and manufacturing engineer.

Charles Goodyear may also refer to:

Charles Goodyear (politician) (1804–1876), United States Representative from New York
Charles W. Goodyear (1846–1911), attorney and President of the Great Southern Lumber Company
Chip Goodyear (born 1958), former CEO of BHP Billiton Limited